Carla Sue Garrett (born July 31, 1967, in Albuquerque, New Mexico) is a former American female weightlifter and  discus thrower representing the United States in both sports at international competitions.

Life
Garrett attended the University of Arizona.

After her career she became the strength and conditioning coach for the football team at Salpointe Catholic High School. She has been at Salpointe since 2006.

Weightlifting
She competed in the super heavyweight class. She won the silver medal at the 1991 and 1993 World Weightlifting Championships.

Discus throwing
Garett participated at the 1992 Summer Olympics in the discus throw event. Garrett didn't make it out of her group in the qualifying heats, finishing 13th out of 14 with a throw of 58.06 meters. She also competed at the 1991 and 1993 World Championships in Athletics. Her personal best is 60.54 metre, set in 1992.

References

1967 births
Living people
American female weightlifters
World Weightlifting Championships medalists
Athletes (track and field) at the 1992 Summer Olympics
American female discus throwers
Olympic track and field athletes of the United States
World Athletics Championships athletes for the United States
Track and field athletes from Albuquerque, New Mexico
20th-century American women